Sonja Newcombe (born March 7, 1988) is an American indoor volleyball player, a member of the United States women's national volleyball team. She currently plays for Liaoning women's volleyball team in China.

She participated in the 2013 FIVB World Grand Prix, 2014 Montreux Volley Masters, and 2017 Women's Pan-American Volleyball Cup.

Clubs

References

External links
Player info Team USA
Player info FIVB
Player info CEV
 Player info legavolley

1988 births
Living people
American women's volleyball players
People from Lake Arrowhead, California
Volleyball players from California
Oregon Ducks women's volleyball players
Wing spikers
American expatriate sportspeople in Romania
Expatriate volleyball players in Romania
Expatriate volleyball players in France
Expatriate volleyball players in Turkey
Expatriate volleyball players in Germany
Expatriate volleyball players in Russia
Expatriate volleyball players in Azerbaijan
Expatriate volleyball players in China
American expatriate sportspeople in France
American expatriate sportspeople in Turkey
American expatriate sportspeople in Germany
American expatriate sportspeople in Russia
American expatriate sportspeople in Azerbaijan
American expatriate sportspeople in China
American expatriate volleyball players